Ren Yexiang (born 1961) is a Chinese actress of the 1980s.

Biography
Ren Yexiang was born in Changsha, Hunan in 1961.  She was admitted to Central Academy of Drama in 1976.  She played a role in Yangfan (扬帆, 1981), Longing for My Native Country (1981), Forever Young (青春万岁, 1983), Yilushunfeng (一路顺风, 1983).

References

External links
 Ren Yexiang
 

1961 births
Living people
Actresses from Hunan
Actresses from Changsha
Central Academy of Drama alumni
Chinese film actresses